Joplin High School is a public high school located in Joplin, Missouri, United States, founded in 1885. The school serves students in grades 9 through 12 and is the only traditional high school in the Joplin School District.

History
In 1885, Joplin High School began operation. The original site was expanded in 1892 to accommodate more students, and in 1897, students moved to a new site due to continued growth. In 1911, the students built a biplane and on October 11, 1911 Harold Robinson piloted the plane and it crashed, killing a bystander, James Kinney. A successful 1915 referendum allocated $350,000 for a new school, which opened in January 1918. In 1955, the new building was already too small to hold all the students, and a new $2.5 million bond was approved. When this proved to be too small of an amount of funding, voters rejected two additional bonds, leading to a student walk-out in 1957 in support of new facilities. A bond in early 1958 was approved to finish construction of the school, and classes commenced in the latest building that fall. Joplin was racially integrated without incident.

Later, in 1968, Joplin High School split into two high schools, one named Parkwood at 2104 Indiana Avenue and the other was named Memorial High School at 310 W. 8th Street. Joplin had two public high schools for the next 17 years until the Baby Boom enrollment bubble burst, leading to the consolidation of the two back into Joplin High School.

Extensive renovations completed in 2003, and a television studio was completed in 2005.

2011 tornado
The 2011 Joplin tornado that killed 161 people in Joplin extensively damaged the high school and Franklin Tech. The high school's graduation ceremonies had taken place about three miles away on the Missouri Southern State University campus shortly before the tornado struck. In the weeks after the tornado, it was determined that the campus would need to be completely rebuilt. 
Planning for a temporary school began four days after the May 22 tornado.  School officials announced in June 2011 that juniors and seniors in the 201112 class would attend classes in a section of Northpark Mall in the renovated former Shopko location, while freshmen and sophomores held classes at the former Memorial High School building. Classes began as scheduled on August 17, 2011.

On May 20, 2012, President Barack Obama addressed the JHS graduating class's commencement ceremony, held almost one year to the day of the deadly tornado.

Temporary campus and facilities
From August 2011 to May 2014 the school was split between a renovated former Shopko store at Northpark Mall and a former high school.  The design of this temporary facility was awarded the Council of Educational Facilities Planners International's 2012 James D. MacConnell Award for excellence in school design.

On May 22, 2012, the groundbreaking ceremony was held marking the start of construction of the new permanent replacement school.  Construction costs for the new 488,000 plus-square-foot facility designed by Corner Greer Associates of Joplin and the Overland Park, Kansas firm DLR Group, which includes a state of the art vocational technical center, are expected to be $120 million.

After three years in temporary campuses as a result of the 2011 tornado, Joplin High School opened at 2104 Indiana Ave. on September 2, 2014.

Athletics and co-curricular activities
JHS athletic teams are nicknamed the Eagles and compete in the Central Ozark Conference, joining the conference in 2018 after previously being a member of the Ozark Conference.

JHS fields two competitive show choirs, the mixed-gender "Sound Dimension" and the all-female "Touch of Class". It previously fielded another mixed-gender group, "New Expressions", and another all-female group, "Glitz". The program also hosts an annual competition.

Noted alumni 
Robert Cummings, actor
 Jacqueline Jakway, neuroscientist
Steve Luebber, baseball player
Jamie McMurray, racing driver

References

 Joplin schools: A long history of change

External links

Joplin High School official website
Franklin Tech official website
Joplin School District website
Aerial photo taken June 1, 2011 of tornado-damaged Joplin High School - xpda.com

Buildings and structures in Joplin, Missouri
Public high schools in Missouri
Schools in Jasper County, Missouri
Education in Joplin, Missouri
1885 establishments in Missouri
Educational institutions established in 1885